Sir William Osler, 1st Baronet,  (July 12, 1849 – December 29, 1919) was a Canadian physician and one of the "Big Four" founding professors of Johns Hopkins Hospital. Osler created the first residency program for specialty training of physicians, and he was the first to bring medical students out of the lecture hall for bedside clinical training. He has frequently been described as the Father of Modern Medicine and one of the "greatest diagnosticians ever to wield a stethoscope". Osler was a person of many interests, who in addition to being a physician, was a bibliophile, historian, author, and renowned practical joker. Outside of medicine, he was passionate about medical libraries and medical history and among his achievements were the founding of the History of Medicine Society (formally "section"), at the Royal Society of Medicine, London. In the field of librarianship he was instrumental in founding the Medical Library Association of Great Britain and Ireland, the (North American) Association of Medical Librarians (now known as the Medical Library Association) with three others, including Margaret Charlton, the medical librarian of his alma mater, McGill University. He left his large history of medicine library to McGill, where it continues to exist as the Osler Library.

Biography

Family
William Osler's great-grandfather, Edward Osler, was variously described as either a merchant seaman or a pirate. One of William's uncles, Edward Osler (1798–1863), a medical officer in the Royal Navy, wrote the Life of Lord Exmouth and the poem The Voyage.

In 1833, Featherstone Osler announced that he wanted to become a minister of the Church of England.

As a teenager, Featherstone Osler was aboard  when it was nearly destroyed by Atlantic storms and left adrift for weeks. Serving in the Navy, he was shipwrecked off Barbados. In 1837, Featherstone Osler officially retired from the Navy and emigrated to Canada, becoming a "saddle-bag minister" in rural Upper Canada. When Featherstone Osler and his bride, Ellen Free Picton, arrived in Canada, they were nearly shipwrecked again on Egg Island in the Gulf of Saint Lawrence. They had several children, including William, Britton Bath Osler and Sir Edmund Boyd Osler.

Early life
William Osler was born in Bond Head, Canada West (now Ontario), on July 12, 1849, and raised after 1857 in Dundas, Ontario. (He was called William after William of Orange, who won the Battle of the Boyne  on July 12, 1690.) His mother, who was very religious, prayed that Osler would become a priest. Osler was educated at Trinity College School (then located in Weston, Ontario).

In 1867, Osler announced that he would follow his father's footsteps into the ministry and entered Trinity College, Toronto (now part of the University of Toronto), in the autumn. At the time, he was becoming increasingly interested in medical science, under the influence of James Bovell and the Rev. William Arthur Johnson, encouraging him to switch his career.<ref>Joseph Hanaway, '(1996). 'McGill Medicine: The First Half Century, 1829–1885. McGill-Queen's Press. p. 179</ref>Sir William Osler. The Quotable Osler. ACP Press. p.283 
 
In 1868, Osler enrolled in the Toronto School of Medicine, a privately owned institution that was not part of the Medical Faculty of the University of Toronto. Osler lived with James Bovell for a time, and through Johnson, he was introduced to the writings of Sir Thomas Browne; his Religio Medici caused a deep impression on him. Osler left the Toronto School of Medicine after being accepted into the MDCM program at the McGill University Faculty of Medicine in Montreal, and he received his medical degree (MDCM) in 1872.

Career
Following post-graduate training under Rudolf Virchow in Germany, Osler returned to the McGill University Faculty of Medicine as a professor in 1874. There, he created the first formal journal club. During this time, he also showed interest in comparative pathology and is considered the first to teach veterinary pathology in North America as part of a broad understanding of disease pathogenesis.  In 1884, he was appointed Chair of Clinical Medicine at the University of Pennsylvania in Philadelphia and in 1885, was one of the seven founding members of the Association of American Physicians, a society dedicated to "the advancement of scientific and practical medicine." When he left Philadelphia in 1889, his farewell address, "Aequanimitas", was on the imperturbability (calm amid storm) and equanimity (moderated emotion, tolerance) necessary for physicians.

In 1889, he accepted the position as the first Physician-in-Chief of the new Johns Hopkins Hospital in Baltimore, Maryland. Shortly afterwards, in 1893, Osler was instrumental in the creation of the Johns Hopkins School of Medicine and became one of the school's first professors of medicine. Osler quickly increased his reputation as a clinician, humanitarian, and teacher. He presided over a rapidly expanding domain. In the hospital's first year of operation, when it had 220 beds, 788 patients were seen for a total of over 15,000 days of treatment. Sixteen years later, when Osler left for Oxford, over 4,200 patients were seen for a total of nearly 110,000 days of treatment.

In 1905, he was appointed to the Regius Professor of Medicine at Oxford, which he held until his death. He was also a Student (fellow) of Christ Church, Oxford.

In the UK, he initiated the founding in 1907 of the Association of Physicians and was founding Senior Editor of its publication the Quarterly Journal of Medicine until his death.

In 1911, he initiated the Postgraduate Medical Association, of which he was the first President. In the same year, Osler was named a baronet in the Coronation Honours List for his contributions to the field of medicine.

In January 1919 he was appointed President of the Fellowship of Medicine  and was also in October 1919 appointed founding President of the merged Fellowship of Medicine and Postgraduate Medical Association, now the Fellowship of Postgraduate Medicine.

The largest collection of Osler's letters and papers is at the Osler Library of McGill University in Montreal and a collection of his papers is also held at the United States National Library of Medicine in Bethesda, Maryland.

Assessment

Perhaps Osler's greatest influence on medicine was to insist that students learn from seeing and talking to patients and the establishment of the medical residency. The latter idea spread across the English-speaking world and remains in place today in most teaching hospitals. Through this system, physicians in training make up much of a teaching hospital's medical staff. The success of his residency system depended, in large part, on its pyramidal structure with many interns, fewer assistant residents and a single chief resident, who originally occupied that position for years. While at Hopkins, Osler established the full-time, sleep-in residency system whereby staff physicians lived in the administration building of the hospital. As established, the residency was open-ended, and long tenure was the rule. Physicians spent as long as seven or eight years as residents, during which time they led a restricted, almost monastic life.

He wrote in an essay "Books and Men" that "He who studies medicine without books sails an uncharted sea, but he who studies medicine without patients does not go to sea at all." His best-known saying was "Listen to your patient, he is telling you the diagnosis", which emphasises the importance of taking a good history.

The contribution to medical education of which he was proudest was his idea of clinical clerkship – having third- and fourth-year students work with patients on the wards. He pioneered the practice of bedside teaching, making rounds with a handful of students, demonstrating what one student referred to as his method of "incomparably thorough physical examination." Soon after arriving in Baltimore, Osler insisted that his medical students attend at bedside early in their training. By their third year they were taking patient histories, performing physicals and doing lab tests examining secretions, blood and excreta.

He reduced the role of didactic lectures and once said he hoped his tombstone would say only, "He brought medical students into the wards for bedside teaching." He also said, "I desire no other epitaph … than the statement that I taught medical students in the wards, as I regard this as by far the most useful and important work I have been called upon to do."  Osler fundamentally changed medical teaching in North America, and this influence, helped by a few such as the Dutch internist P. K. Pel, spread to medical schools across the globe.

Osler was a prolific author and a great collector of books and other material relevant to the history of medicine. He willed his library to the Faculty of Medicine of McGill University where it now forms the nucleus of McGill University's Osler Library of the History of Medicine. Osler was a strong supporter of libraries and served on the library committees at most of the universities at which he taught and was a member of the Board of Curators of the Bodleian Library in Oxford. He was instrumental in founding the Medical Library Association in North America, alongside employee and mentee Marcia Croker Noyes, and served as its second president from 1901 to 1904. In Britain he was the first (and only) president of the Medical Library Association of Great Britain and Ireland and also a president of the Bibliographical Society of London (1913).

Osler was a prolific author and public speaker and his public speaking and writing were both done in a clear, lucid style. His most famous work, The Principles and Practice of Medicine quickly became a key text to students and clinicians alike. It continued to be published in many editions until 2001 and was translated into many languages.Golden, Richard (2004) A History of William Osler's The Principles and Practice of Medicine. Osler Library, McGill University. . It is notable in part for supporting the use of bloodletting as recently as 1923. Though his own textbook was a major influence in medicine for many years, Osler described Avicenna as the "author of the most famous medical textbook ever written". He noted that Avicenna's Canon of Medicine remained "a medical bible for a longer time than any other work". Osler's essays were important guides to physicians. The title of his most famous essay, "Aequanimitas", espousing the importance of imperturbability, is the motto on the Osler family crest and is used on the Osler housestaff tie and scarf at Hopkins.

Controversies

Racism
Osler held a number of views that were not atypical for a physician of his generation, but were politically controversial even at that time.
Osler said Canada should be a "white man's country" in a 1914 speech given around the time of the Komagata Maru incident involving immigration from India.
Osler wrote “I hate Latin Americans” in a letter to Henry Vining Ogden.
Under the pseudonym "Egerton Yorrick Davis", Osler mocked Indigenous people: “Every primitive tribe retains some vile animal habit not yet eliminated in the upward march of the race.” 
Uncovering this historical context, the journalists David Bruser and Markus Grill and the archivist Nils Seethaler reconstruct the shipment of several indigenous skulls by Osler from Canada to Germany, which were (previously unknown) in the custody of the State Museums of Berlin.

Gerontology
Osler is well known in the field of gerontology for the speech he gave when leaving Hopkins to become the Regius Professor of Medicine at Oxford.  "The Fixed Period", given on February 22, 1905, included some controversial words about old age.  Osler, who had a well-developed humorous side to his character, was in his mid-fifties when he gave the speech and in it he mentioned Anthony Trollope's The Fixed Period (1882), which envisaged a college where men retired at 67 and after being given a year to settle their affairs, would be "peacefully extinguished by chloroform". He claimed that, "the effective, moving, vitalizing work of the world is done between the ages of twenty-five and forty" and it was downhill from then on.  Osler's speech was covered by the popular press which headlined their reports with "Osler recommends chloroform at sixty". The concept of mandatory euthanasia for humans after a "fixed period" (often 60 years) became a recurring theme in 20th century imaginative fiction—for example, Isaac Asimov's 1950 novel Pebble in the Sky and Half a Life (Star Trek: The Next Generation). In the 3rd edition of his Textbook, he also coined the description of pneumonia as "the friend of the aged" since it allowed elderly individuals a quick, comparatively painless death: "Taken off by it in an acute, short, not often painful illess, the old man escapes those "cold gradations of decay" so distressing to himself and his friends." Coincidentally, Osler himself died of pneumonia.

Personal life and family

An inveterate prankster, he wrote several humorous pieces under the pseudonym "Egerton Yorrick Davis", even fooling the editors of the Philadelphia Medical News into publishing a report on the extremely rare phenomenon of penis captivus, on December 13, 1884. The letter was apparently a response to a report on the phenomenon of vaginismus reported three weeks previously in the Philadelphia Medical News by Osler's colleague Theophilus Parvin. Davis, a prolific writer of letters to medical societies, purported to be a retired U.S. Army surgeon living in Caughnawaga, Quebec (now Kahnawake), author of a controversial paper on the obstetrical habits of Native American tribes that was suppressed and unpublished. Osler would enhance Davis's myth by signing Davis's name to hotel registers and medical conference attendance lists; Davis was eventually reported drowned in the Lachine Rapids in 1884.

Throughout his life, Osler was a great admirer of the 17th century physician and philosopher Sir Thomas Browne.

He died at the age of 70, on December 29, 1919, in Oxford, during the Spanish influenza epidemic, most likely of complications from undiagnosed bronchiectasis. His wife, Grace, lived another nine years but succumbed to a series of strokes. Sir William and Lady Osler's ashes now rest in a niche in the Osler Library at McGill University. They had two sons, one of whom died shortly after birth.  The other, Edward Revere Osler, was mortally wounded in combat in World War I at the age of 21, during the 3rd battle of Ypres (also known as the battle of Passchendaele). At the time of his death in August 1917, he was a second lieutenant in the (British) Royal Field Artillery; Lt. Osler's grave is in the Dozinghem Military Cemetery in West Flanders, Belgium. According to one biographer, Osler was emotionally crushed by the loss; he was particularly anguished by the fact that his influence had been used to procure a military commission for his son, who had mediocre eyesight. Lady Osler (Grace Revere) was born in Boston in 1854; her paternal great-grandfather was Paul Revere. In 1876, she married Samuel W. Gross, chairman of surgery at Jefferson Medical College in Philadelphia and son of Dr. Samuel D. Gross. Gross died in 1889 and in 1892 she married William Osler who was then professor of medicine at Johns Hopkins University.

Osler was a founding donor of the American Anthropometric Society, a group of academics who pledged to donate their brains for scientific study. Osler's brain was taken to the Wistar Institute in Philadelphia to join the Wistar Brain Collection. In April 1987 it was taken to the Mütter Museum, on 22nd Street near Chestnut in Philadelphia where it was displayed during the annual meeting of the American Osler Society.Osler Library Newsletter No. 60 February 1989 . mcgill.ca He was elected as a member to the American Philosophical Society in 1885.

In 1925, a biography of William Osler was written by Harvey Cushing, who received the 1926 Pulitzer Prize for the work. A later biography by Michael Bliss was published in 1999. In 1994 Osler was inducted into the Canadian Medical Hall of Fame.

Eponyms
Osler lent his name to a number of diseases, signs and symptoms, as well as to a number of buildings that have been named for him.

Conditions

 Osler's sign is an artificially high systolic blood pressure reading due to the calcification of atherosclerotic arteries
 Osler's nodes are raised tender nodules on the pulps of fingertips or toes, suggestive of subacute bacterial endocarditis. Osler described them as "ephemeral spots of a painful nodular erythema, chiefly in the skin of the hands and feet." Osler nodes are usually painful, as opposed to Janeway lesions which are due to emboli and are painless.
 Osler–Weber–Rendu disease (also known as hereditary hemorrhagic telangiectasia) is a syndrome of multiple vascular malformations on the skin, in the nasal and oral mucosa, in the lungs and elsewhere.
 Osler–Vaquez disease (also known as Polycythemia vera)
 Osler–Libman–Sacks syndrome is an atypical, verrucous, nonbacterial, valvular and mural endocarditis. Final stage of systemic lupus erythematosus.
 Osler's manoeuvre: in pseudohypertension, the blood pressure as measured by the sphygmomanometer is artificially high because of arterial wall calcification. Osler's manoeuvre takes a patient who has a palpable, although pulseless, radial artery while the blood pressure cuff is inflated above systolic pressure; thus they are considered to have "Osler's sign."
Osler's rule: States that a neurological defect has to be related to a specific lesion, in contrast to Hickam's dictum, which states that the neurological defect can be due to several lesions.
 Osler's syndrome is a syndrome of recurrent episodes of colic pain, with typical radiation to back, cold shiverings and fever; due to the presence in Vater's diverticulum of a free-moving gallstone which is larger than the orifice.
 Osler's triad (also known as Austrian Syndrome): association of pneumonia, endocarditis, and meningitis.
 Sphryanura osleri is a trematode worm found in the gills of a newt.
 Oslerus osleri is a metastrongyloid nematode lungworm parasite of wild and domestic canids. Osler discovered the parasite while teaching comparative pathology at McGill.

Buildings

 Osler Building at The Johns Hopkins Hospital currently The Johns Hopkins Hospital Human Resources. Until 2012 the Medical Intensive Care Unit (MICU) was located on the 7th floor
 Sir William Osler Elementary School – Elementary School in Vancouver, British Columbia
 Ecole Sir William Osler School – Elementary School Winnipeg, Manitoba
 Sir William Osler Elementary School – HWDSB Elementary School in Dundas, Ontario
 Sir William Osler High School, Agincourt area of Scarborough in what is now Toronto, Ontario
 Sir William Osler Public School Simcoe County District School Board Elementary School in Bradford West Gwillimbury, Ontario and 3 kilometres away from his birthplace, Bond Head, Ontario
 Osler Library of the History of Medicine, McGill University, Montreal. Osler left his 8000 volume collection of books on the history of medicine to his alma mater.  The library now holds over 100,000 volumes and is Canada's de facto 'national library of the history of medicine'
 Promenade Sir-William-Osler (Formerly the upper section of rue Drummond.) adjacent to the campus of McGill University in Montreal, Quebec and leading to the McIntyre Medical Sciences Building,  which houses the Osler Library of the History of Medicine William Osler Health System 1998 near Brampton, Ontario
 Osler House is the student mess for clinical medical students of Oxford University and is found at the John Radcliffe Hospital in Oxford
 Osler House is also the name of the old Observer's House, next to the Radcliffe Observatory in Green Templeton College, Oxford, a Grade I listed building
 Osler House is one of the two undergraduate hostels of the JIPMER medical school in Puducherry, India
 Osler Textbook Room 1999 at Johns Hopkins Hospital in the room in the Billings Building where Osler wrote "Principles and Practice of Medicine". It houses a collection of Osler memorabilia
 Osler Center for Clinical Excellence 2002 devoted to teaching "the basic elements of a sound doctor patient relationship"
 Osler Hall is Main Hall of "Med Chi" or Medical and Chirurgical Faculty, the Maryland State Medical Society, located on Cathedral Street in Baltimore. The Med Chi House of Delegates meets and deliberates in Osler Hall wherein hang numerous portraits of famous Maryland physicians including a large portrait of Osler
 Osler House (a medical residence) in Townsville, Queensland, Australia is believed to be named after him 
 Osler House, Osler's childhood home in Dundas, Ontario.

 Awards 
 American Association for the History of medicine, William Osler Medal.
 Osler Library, McGill University. Pam and Rolando Del Maestro William Osler Medical Students Essay Awards.
 Osler Lecture at the Worshipful Society of Apothecaries.
 Student Award in Oslerian Medicine

 References 

 Bibliography 

Celebrating the Contributions of William Osler.  Alan Mason Chesney Medical Archives 1999.  Johns Hopkins Medical Institutions.
Famous Canadian Physicians: Sir William Osler at Library and Archives Canada.
 The Introduction and other editorial matter is freely available on-line. 

External links

 Sir William Osler in the US National Library of Medicine's Profiles in Science 
 Sir William Osler Archival Collection at the Osler Library of the History of Medicine, McGill University
 William Osler Letter Index, Osler Library of the History of Medicine
 
 William Osler Photo Collection, Osler Library of the History of Medicine
 Sir William Osler – The Canadian Encyclopedia''
 Osler Library, brief biography of William Osler
 
 
 
 Essays by William Osler at Quotidiana.org
 Aequanimitas from the Alan Mason Chesney Medical Archives of the Johns Hopkins Medical Institutions.
 Biography on WhoNamedIt.com
 Biography from Osler House, Oxford, focusing on his Oxford years
 Osler House – Dundas – B&B, Meetings, Celebrations, Receptions, Retreats
 Ontario Plaques — Sir William Osler
  at 13 Norham Gardens, owned by Sir William Osler while Regius Professor of Medicine at Oxford University (information from Green Templeton College, Oxford)
 Osler House Club, Oxford University
 The American Osler Society
 The Osler Club of London
 Osler biography, chronology, bibliography & resources (from Johns Hopkins)
 Systemofmedicine.com, Oslerian medical education resource
 William Osler Health Centre
 

 
1849 births
1919 deaths
Deaths from the Spanish flu pandemic in England
Baronets in the Baronetage of the United Kingdom
Canadian baronets recommended by the British government
Book and manuscript collectors
Canadian expatriate academics in the United States
Canadian medical researchers
Physicians from Ontario
Fellows of Christ Church, Oxford
Johns Hopkins University faculty
Johns Hopkins Hospital physicians
McGill University Faculty of Medicine alumni
Pre-Confederation Ontario people
Trinity College (Canada) alumni
University of Pennsylvania faculty
People from Dundas, Ontario
Persons of National Historic Significance (Canada)
Regius Professors of Medicine (University of Oxford)
Fellows of the Royal Society
Canadian people of English descent
Fellows of the Royal College of Physicians
Presidents of the History of Medicine Society
Presidents of the American Pediatric Society
Canadian expatriates in Germany
Canadian expatriates in England
Members of the American Philosophical Society
Presidents of the Classical Association
American medical writers